The .340 Weatherby Magnum rifle cartridge was introduced in 1962 by creator Roy Weatherby to fill the gap between the .300 Weatherby Magnum and the .378 Weatherby Magnum, and in response to the .338 Winchester Magnum released in 1958.

The .340 Weatherby Magnum uses the same .338 in. diameter bullets as the .338 Winchester Magnum, but it does so at greater velocity than its Winchester competition. Reloaders may have trouble matching the published Weatherby velocities as Weatherby factory ammunition is loaded to maximum specifications. Weatherby no longer loads the 250gr. round-nose cartridge pictured but continues to load the 250 gr. Spire Point and 250 gr. Nosler Partition. Weatherby has also expanded their factory loads including Nosler Ballistic-tip and Barnes TSX bullets complementing the powerful cartridge. Currently  A-square is the only other factory ammunition producer of the .340 Weatherby Magnum, which has led to limited popularity of the caliber. In field tests the .340 clearly outperforms the 300 Ultra mag, .338 Win mag. and even rivals the larger .375 H&H, providing a much flatter shooting and harder hitting performance.

This cartridge is powerful enough for even the largest North American game and is suitable for most African game as well.

See also
 Weatherby
 .338 Winchester Magnum
 .338-378 Weatherby Magnum
 List of rifle cartridges

References

Pistol and rifle cartridges
Magnum rifle cartridges
Weatherby Magnum rifle cartridges